The Lenti Madonna or Bache Madonna is a tempera and gold on panel painting by Carlo Crivelli, executed c. 1472–1473, and signed OPVS KAROLI CRIVELLI VENETI. It is now in the Metropolitan Museum of Art in New York, which it entered in 1944.

Small and intended for private devotion, it was probably the work seen by Orsini around 1790 in Pier Giovanni Lenti's house in Ascoli Piceno with a "K" in its signature rather than the more usual "C" - the alternative candidate is the Ancona Madonna (probably c. 1480), but that is signed "CAROLI" not "KAROLI". The first definitive mention of the work dates to 1852, placing it in the Jones Collection in Clytha, from which it passed to the Baring Collection in 1871 and then the Northbrook Collection. The Duveen Brothers acquired it in 1927, ceding it to Jules S. Bache, before finally passing to its present collection.

References

1473 paintings
Paintings of the Madonna and Child by Carlo Crivelli
Paintings in the collection of the Metropolitan Museum of Art